Houseman is a surname. Notable people with the surname include:

Edward Houseman (1869–1942), English cricketer
Ian Houseman (born 1969), English cricketer
John Houseman (1902–1988), Romanian-born American actor and film producer
John Houseman (baseball) (1870–1922), Dutch-born American baseball infielder
Julius Houseman (1832–1891), American entrepreneur and politician
Peter Houseman (1945–1977), English footballer
René Houseman (1953-2018), Argentine footballer
Susan Houseman (born 1956), American economist

Fictional characters
Jim Houseman, the fictional United States Secretary of Defense in the game Metal Gear Solid

See also
Housman (surname) 

English-language surnames